Akyazı is a Turkish toponym meaning "good luck" (literally "white writing," alluding to a favorable court decision). It may refer to the following places in Turkey:

 Akyazı, a town and district of Sakarya Province
 Akyazı, Adilcevaz, a village
 Akyazı, Adıyaman, a village in the District of Adıyaman, Adıyaman Province
 Akyazı, Amasya, a village in the District of Amasya, Amasya Province
 Akyazı, Aziziye
 Akyazı, Besni, a village in the District of Besni, Adıyaman Province
 Akyazı, Çorum
 Akyazı, Düzce
 Akyazı, Erzincan
 Akyazı, Yapraklı